Appointment with Crime is a 1946 British crime film directed by John Harlow and starring William Hartnell, Raymond Lovell, Joyce Howard and Robert Beatty.

Plot
Leo Martin (Hartnell) works for a criminal gang run by Gus Loman (Lovell) that primarily uses a smash and grab tactic. During one particular risky robbery heist, Leo breaks the window at a jewellery store only to have his wrists broken by a security shutter falling on them. He is soon caught and brought to prison to serve his term. Throughout his stay, Leo does not reveal who he is working for to the authorities but instead serves his time, angered by Gus for running out on him during the robbery.

When Leo is released, he returns to Gus to obtain a job. Gus harshly rebuffs him and points out how Leo's injured wrists would prevent him from working as a thief. This leads Leo to seek complete vengeance against Gus. He decides to frame Gus for murder by stealing his gun and murdering the getaway driver (now working as a cab driver) who had also abandoned him during the abortive raid. He manages to provide himself with an alibi to avoid any prosecution. During this scheme he meets Carol Dane (Howard), who is unaware of his true nature, and the two begin a romance. Later he confronts Gus with the understanding that if he does not give him money he'll hand over the gun to the police.

After Gus hands over the money, he contacts Gregory Lang (Lom), whom he is actually working under. Gregory is an antiques dealer who hired Gus to steal jewellery and art pieces for him. Meanwhile, Leo learns that Detective Inspector Rogers is investigating the murder case. He attempts to assure Rogers that he is attempting to live a life away from crime, but Rogers continues to question Leo's character and whereabouts during the night of the murder.

Things begin to go downhill when Leo and Gregory learn that it was actually Gregory's gun that was used rather than Gus's. Gregory becomes upset and has his companion plot to murder Gus while forcefully threatening Leo. Leo's wrists are crushed again, but he and Gus reach a deal for Leo to bring back the gun and steal a jewel. All the while, Rogers uncovers more and more clues.

When Leo steals the jewel and brings back the gun to Gregory, a gunfight ensues, leaving Gregory dead. As Leo jumps on the train to run away with Carol, she confronts him about his lies. Soon after, Rogers arrives after finally learning that Leo murdered the cab driver. He prepares to apprehend Leo, but Leo tries to jump out of the train window only to have the window slam shut on his wrists.

Cast
William Hartnell as Leo Martin  
Raymond Lovell as Gus Loman  
Joyce Howard as Carol Dane  
Robert Beatty as Detective Inspector Rogers  
Herbert Lom as Gregory Lang  
Alan Wheatley as Noel Penn  
Cyril Smith as Detective Sergeant Charlie Weeks  
Elsie Wagstaff as Mrs. Wilkins  
Ian Fleming as Prison governor  
Wally Patch as Joe Fisher (garage manager)  
Ian McLean as Detective Mason
Wilfrid Hyde-White as Cleaner
Ivor Barnard as Jonah Crackle

Reception
Appointment with Crime was the 12th most popular film at the British box office in 1946 after The Wicked Lady, The Bells of St. Mary's, Piccadilly Incident, The Captive Heart, Road to Utopia, Caravan, Anchors Away, The Corn is Green, Gilda, The House on 92nd Street and The Overlanders.

Critical
The Radio Times called it "solid noir," rating it 3/5 stars.

References

External links
 
 
 

1946 films
1940s crime thriller films
British crime thriller films
Films directed by John Harlow
British black-and-white films
Film noir
British gangster films
British films about revenge
Films shot at British National Studios
1940s English-language films
1940s British films